Vincent Samson Appice (born September 13, 1957) is an American rock drummer best known for his work with the bands Dio, Black Sabbath, and Heaven & Hell. Of Italian descent, he is the younger brother of drummer Carmine Appice.

Career 
Appice took up the drums at the age of nine, taking lessons from the same teacher as his brother Carmine Appice.  When he was sixteen, Appice and his band BOMF met John Lennon at Record Plant Studios. Lennon took a liking to the group and used them as a backing band in several performances, including the final one before his death. He moved on to record with Rick Derringer on Derringer (1976), Sweet Evil (1977), and Derringer Live (1977), before forming his own band Axis and recording It's A Circus World (1978).

Appice joined Black Sabbath during the tour in support of the Heaven and Hell album in 1980. He was quickly brought in to replace original drummer Bill Ward, who quit the band mid-tour due to personal issues. Appice arrived for his first show with Black Sabbath at the Aloha Stadium in Hawaii with his entire drum kit packed into the back of a car. He was forced to learn the band's songs on stage, using hastily written crib notes for each unfamiliar song. A sudden rain storm made the ink run on Vinny's notes.  According to an interview conducted at NAMM in 2012, Vinny stated that at the end of the show during the bows he tossed the notebook into the crowd.  Appice subsequently appeared on the Black Sabbath albums Mob Rules (1981) and Live Evil (1982).

In late 1982 he left Black Sabbath along with vocalist Ronnie James Dio and formed the band Dio. They recorded Holy Diver (1983), The Last in Line (1984), Sacred Heart (1985), Intermission (1986), and Dream Evil (1987). In December 1989 Appice left Dio and briefly teamed up with Dokken bassist Jeff Pilson in the band Flesh & Blood.

After joining World War III in 1990, he returned to Black Sabbath in 1992 for the Dehumanizer album and tour. "I like Vinny – he's a nice chap," Tony Iommi reflected to the Sabbath fanzine Southern Cross. "Vinny was asked to continue with the Sabbath thing, but he didn't. I like Vinny's playing." Appice rejoined Dio and they recorded Strange Highways (1994) and Angry Machines (1996).

Prior to the 1996 tour, Appice played drums for Las Vegas–based guitarist, Raven Storm, on his album The Storm Project, which also involved long-time Dio engineer and producer, Angelo Arcuri. Arcuri was also a childhood friend of the Appice brothers.

In 2005 Appice appeared on a rap recording by Circle of Tyrants, whose lineup included Necro, Ill Bill, Goretex, and Mr Hyde, also collaborating with Alex Skolnick. Appice played two shows in Las Vegas with the Sin City Sinners in October 2009. Appice rejoined his Black Sabbath bandmates Ronnie James Dio, Geezer Butler, and Tony Iommi in 2006 as Heaven & Hell, touring and releasing one studio album, The Devil You Know, before Dio's death in 2010.

In 2006 he recorded the CD Dinosaurs, together with Carl Sentance, Carlos Cavazo and Jeff Pilson. The CD was produced by guitarist-musician Andy Menario (leader of Martiria band) and featured lyrics written by Italian poet Marco Roberto Capelli, who is also Martiria's lyricist.

He is currently participating in "Drum Wars" shows with his brother Carmine, which feature a guest appearance from vocalist Paul Shortino.

Appice formed the band Kill Devil Hill with former Down and Pantera bassist Rex Brown, guitar slinger Mark Zavon and lead vocalist Dewey Bragg.  Kill Devil Hill's self-titled debut album was released May 22, 2012, via Steamhammer/SPV and landed at No. 9 on the Billboard Top New Artist Albums (HeatSeekers) Chart, No. 41 on the Top Hard Music Chart and No. 50 on the Independent Album Chart.

Following the death of Dio frontman Ronnie James Dio in 2010, the original lineup of Vinny Appice on drums, Jimmy Bain on bass, Vivian Campbell on guitar and Claude Schnell on keyboards reunited along with vocalist Andrew Freeman to perform covers of Dio songs they originally recorded.

On November 25, 2013, it was announced that Appice had formed a new band called WAMI, which features vocalist Doogie White, bassist Marco Mendoza, and 16-year-old Polish guitarist Iggy Gwadera. On February 12, 2014, the upcoming album title was revealed to be Kill the King, due for release in the spring. On February 25, the album cover and track listing were revealed.

On March 10, 2014, it was announced that Appice had left Kill Devil Hill, and that former Type O Negative drummer Johnny Kelly was his replacement.

Last in Line began recording tracks for a new album of original material in April 2014, followed by the release of a snippet of the new track "Devil in Me" in June. The album, produced by former Dio bassist, Jeff Pilson, was announced to have an expected release date in early 2016.

In early 2014 Appice joined hard rock band Hollywood Monsters where he played on the album Big Trouble (on 8 tracks out of 11) which was released in 2014 on Mausoleum Records. The album features Steph Honde on vocals and guitars, Tim Bogert on bass, Don Airey on keyboards and Paul Di'Anno on lead vocals on the bonus track. The same year, Appice was a guest performer on Eli Cook's album, Primitive Son.

In 2015, it was announced that Appice will appear on the EP "Mainly Songs About Robots" by Australian progressive rock band Toehider, to be released in September 2015. One week later on November 17, Last in Line released a music video for their premiere single "Devil in Me", and announced that their debut album, entitled Heavy Crown would be released on February 19, 2016. The band will release a studio album of original material without Schnell. The same year, Appice was invited to play drums for a new project of Whitesnake and former Night Ranger guitarist Joel Hoekstra, called Joel Hoekstra's 13, with an album called Dying to Live, released on October 16.

On September 30, the new Resurrection Kings band was announced. The band is formed by Appice with former Dio guitarist Craig Goldy, Sean McNabb on bass and Chas West on vocals.

On January 18, 2017, Appice was inducted into the Hall of Heavy Metal History for his contributions to Heavy Metal drumming.

Discography

John Lennon 
Walls and Bridges (hand claps on  "Whatever Gets You Thru the Night"; uncredited) (1974)

Rick Derringer 
Derringer (1976)
Sweet Evil (1977)
Derringer Live (1977)

Axis 
It's A Circus World (1978)

Ray Gomez 
Volume (1980)

Black Sabbath 
Mob Rules (1981)
Live Evil (1982)
Dehumanizer (1992)
Black Sabbath: The Dio Years (2007)
Live at Hammersmith Odeon (2007)

Dio 
Holy Diver (1983)
The Last in Line (1984)
Sacred Heart (1985)
Intermission (1986)
Dream Evil (1987)
Strange Highways (1993)
Angry Machines (1996)
Inferno – Last in Live (1998)

Hear 'N Aid 
 Hear 'n Aid – "Stars" (1986)

World War III 
World War III (1990)

War & Peace 
The Flesh & Blood Sessions (1999 / 2013)

Raven Storm 
The Storm Project (2001)

Mark Boals 
Edge of the World (2002)

Power Project 
Dinosaurs (2006)

3 Legged Dogg 
Frozen Summer (2006)

Heaven and Hell 
Live from Radio City Music Hall (2007)
The Devil You Know (2009)
Neon Nights: 30 Years of Heaven & Hell (2010)

Kill Devil Hill 
 Kill Devil Hill (2012)
 Revolution Rise (2013)

Suncrown 
 "Children of the Sea" (Black Sabbath cover) (2012)

Hollywood Monsters 
 Big Trouble (2014)
 Capture the Sun (2016)

WAMI 
 Kill the King (2014)

Martiria 
 Revolution (2014)

Toehider 
 Mainly Songs About Robots (2015)

Ian Ray Logan & Serpent's Ride 
 Between Lights and Shadows (2016)

Joel Hoekstra's 13 
 Dying to Live (2015)
 Running Games (2021)

Stonehand 
 When the Devil Comes (2015)

Resurrection Kings 
 Resurrection Kings (2016)

Last in Line 
 Heavy Crown (2016)
 II (2019)

Ian Ray Logan & King of Twilight 
 Reaching Dreams (on "Success Is to Live (the Life)") (2017)

Adrian Raso 
 Frozen in Time (2017)

The One Man Electrical Band 
 Symptom of the Universe (2017)
 Dark Things (2018)

Appice 
 Sinister (2017) (with his brother Carmine Appice)

Stagma 
Stagma (2018)

Concreto (Brazilian Band) 
 Lama EP (2018)

References

External links 
Vinny Appice Interview NAMM Oral History Library (2012)
 Vinny Appice Official Site

1957 births
Living people
Musicians from Brooklyn
American heavy metal drummers
American rock drummers
Black Sabbath members
Dio (band) members
20th-century American drummers
American male drummers
Heaven & Hell (band) members
Kill Devil Hill (band) members
American people of Italian descent
21st-century American drummers